289P/Blanpain, formerly D/1819 W1 (Blanpain) is a short-period comet that was discovered by Jean-Jacques Blanpain on November 28, 1819. Blanpain described the comet as having a "very small and confused nucleus".  Another independent discovery was made on December 5 of that year by J. L. Pons. Following this the comet was lost, and was given the designation 'D' (Disappeared or Dead). However, in 2003, the orbital elements of newly discovered asteroid  were calculated by Marco Micheli and others to be a probable match for the lost comet.  Further observations of the asteroid in 2005 by David Jewitt using the University of Hawaii 2.2 m telescope on Mauna Kea, appeared to reveal a faint coma, which supports the theory that  is the lost comet, or a part of it.  The comet was officially established as periodic comet 289P in July 2013, after being rediscovered by the Pan-STARRS survey during an outburst event.

289P will be best viewed near and after the 2019-Dec-20 perihelion passage.

Source of Phoenicids 
Comet D/1819 W1 has been proposed as the probable source of the Phoenicid meteor stream, since the first observation of a Phoenicids meteor storm in 1956. Analysis of the orbits of asteroid  have supported this conjecture, and it is thought likely that the comet was already breaking up at the time of its 1819 return.

References

External links 
 289P/Blanpain – Seiichi Yoshida @ aerith.net
 Gary W. Kronk's Cometography
 D/1819 W1 (Blanpain)
 METEOR SHOWERS FROM THE DEBRIS OF BROKEN COMETS: D/1819 W1 (BLANPAIN), 2003 WY25, AND THE PHOENICIDS
 Orbit
 Comet D/1819 W1 (Blanpain): Not Dead Yet
 IAUC 8485: D/1819 W1
 MPEC 2003-W41 : 2003 WY25
 P/1819 W1 = 2003 WY25 (Blanpain), MPEC
 CBET 3574: COMET P/1819 W1 = 2003 WY_25 (BLANPAIN)

Periodic comets
289P
0289
Meteor shower progenitors
Comets in 2019
18191128